The sixth edition of the football tournament at the Pan American Games was held in five cities in Colombia: Cali (main city of the Games) Cartago, Buga, Palmira and Tuluá, from July 31 to August 12, 1971. Twelve teams divided in three groups of four did compete in a round-robin competition, with Mexico defending the title. After the preliminary round there was a final round.

Preliminary round

Group A (Cali)

Group B (Cartago)

Group C (Buga and Tuluá)

Final Round

Positions

Matches

Medalists

Goalscorers

Awards

References

1971
1971 Pan American Games
Pan American Games
Pan
1971